Lifted Bells are an American rock band from Chicago, Illinois. The band consists of members of the bands Their/They're/There, Braid, and Stay Ahead of the Weather.

Career
Lifted Bells began in 2013 with the release of a self-titled EP, via Naked Ally Records. In 2014, Lifted Bells released their second EP titled Lights Out via Naked Ally. In 2016, Lifted Bells signed to Run For Cover Records and released their third EP titled Overreactor.

Discography
EPs
Lifted Bells (2013, Naked Ally)
Lights Out (2014, Naked Ally)
Overreactor (2016, Run For Cover)
Minor Tantrums (2018, Run For Cover)

References

Musical groups from Chicago
Musical groups established in 2013
Run for Cover Records artists
2013 establishments in Illinois